Dittligsee is a lake in the Canton of Berne, Switzerland, near Blumenstein and Wattenwil.

Description 
The lake is situated at an elevation of 652m (2,139 ft) and is almost completely surrounded by reed. Water is deposited into the lake via drainage pipes, while the lake itself flows into a stream, Fallbach.

Attractions 
Other than a small wooden pier, the lake is mostly inaccessible.

References

Lakes of Switzerland
Lakes of the canton of Bern
LDittligsee